The 1976 College Football All-America team is composed of college football players who were selected as All-Americans by various organizations and writers that chose College Football All-America Teams in 1976. The National Collegiate Athletic Association (NCAA) recognizes four selectors as "official" for the 1976 season. They are: (1) the American Football Coaches Association (AFCA); (2) the Associated Press (AP) selected based on the votes of sports writers at AP newspapers; (3) the Football Writers Association of America (FWAA) selected by the nation's football writers; and (4) the United Press International (UPI) selected based on the votes of sports writers at UPI newspapers.  Other selectors included Football News (FN), the Newspaper Enterprise Association (NEA), The Sporting News (TSN), and the Walter Camp Football Foundation (WC).

Three players were unanimously selected by all four official selectors and all five unofficial selectors. They were running backs Tony Dorsett of Pittsburgh and Ricky Bell of USC and defensive end Ross Browner of Notre Dame.

The 1976 USC Trojans football team led all others with five players who received first-team All-American honors in 1976.  In addition to Ricky Bell, the USC honorees were offensive tackle Marvin Powell, defensive end Dennis Thurman, defensive tackle Gary Jeter, and punter Glen Walker. The consensus national champion Pittsburgh Panthers team had two first-team honorees: Tony Dorsett and middle guard Al Romano.

Consensus All-Americans
The following charts identify the NCAA-recognized consensus All-Americans for the year 1976 and displays which first-team designations they received.

Offense

Defense

Offense

Receivers 

 Larry Seivers, Tennessee  (AFCA, AP-1, UPI-1, NEA-1, WC, TSN, CFN)
 Jim Smith, Michigan (AP-1, UPI-2, TSN, FN, NEA-2)
 Wes Chandler, Florida (AP-3, FN, NEA-1)
 Luther Blue, Iowa State (AP-3, FWAA)
 Jim Corbett, Pittsburgh (AP-2)
 Billy Ryckman, Louisiana Tech (AP-2)
 Tony Hill, Stanford (NEA-2)

Tight end 

 Ken MacAfee, Notre Dame (AFCA, FWAA, UPI-1, CFN, NEA-1 WC)
 Clennie Brundidge, Army (UPI-2)
 Don Hasselbeck, Colorado (NEA-2, TSN)

Tackles 

 Mike Vaughan, Oklahoma (AFCA, AP-1, FWAA, UPI-1, WC, FN)
 Chris Ward, Ohio State (AFCA [g], AP-2, UPI-2)
 Warren Bryant, Kentucky (AFCA, AP-2, TSN, CFN, NEA-2, WC)
 Marvin Powell, USC (AP-3, UPI-1, TSN, FN)
 Morris Towns, Missouri (NEA-1, CFN)
 Mike Wilson, Georgia, (AP-1, UPI-2, NEA-1)
 Val Belcher, Houston (NEA-2)
 Steve August, Tulsa (AP-3)

Guards 

 Mark Donahue, Michigan (FWAA, UPI-1, NEA-1, WC, FN)
 Joel Parrish, Georgia (AFCA, AP-3, FWAA, UPI-1, FN, NEA-2, TSN, WC)
 Steve Schindler, Boston College (AP-2, FWAA, NEA-1, TSN, CFN)
 Ted Albrecht, California (AP-1)
 T.J. Humphreys, Arkansas State (AP-1)
 Bill Dufek, Michigan (CFN)
 Tom Brzoza, Pittsburgh (AP-2, UPI-2)
 Donnie Hickman, USC (UPI-2, NEA-2)
 Mitch Hoban, Ball State (AP-3)

Centers 

 Derrel Gofourth, Oklahoma St. (AFCA, UPI-1, FN)
 Billy Bryan, Duke (AP-2, FWAA, WC)
 John Yarno, Idaho (AP-1)
 R. C. Thielemann, Arkansas (NEA-1)
 Bob Rush, Memphis State (NEA-2, TSN)
 Mitch Kahn, UCLA (CFN)
 Leo Tierney, Georgia Tech (AP-3, UPI-2)

Quarterbacks 

 Tommy Kramer, Rice (AFCA, AP-1, UPI-1, WC, CFN)
 Gifford Nielsen, BYU (AP-2, FWAA, UPI-2)
 Vince Ferragamo, Nebraska (AP-3, FN)
 Jeff Dankworth, UCLA  (NEA-1)
 Mark Manges, Maryland (NEA-2)

Running backs 

 Tony Dorsett, Pittsburgh  (AFCA, AP-1, FWAA, UPI-1, CFN, FN, NEA-1, TSN, WC)
 Ricky Bell, USC  (AFCA, AP-1, FWAA, UPI-1, CFN, FN, NEA-1, TSN, WC)
 Rob Lytle, Michigan (AFCA, AP-1, UPI-1, CFN, FN, NEA-2, WC)
 Terry Miller, Oklahoma State (AP-1, FWAA, UPI-2, NEA-2)
 Wendell Tyler, UCLA  
 Scott Dierking, Purdue (AP-2)
 Tony Reed, Colorado (AP-2)
 Mike Voight, North Carolina (AP-2, UPI-2)
 Pete Johnson, Ohio State (UPI-2)
 Andre Herrera, Southern Illinois (AP-3)
 Derrick Jensen, Texas-Arlington (AP-3)
 Jerome Persell, Western Michigan (AP-3)

Defense

Defensive ends 

 Ross Browner, Notre Dame (AFCA, AP-1, FWAA, UPI-1, CFN, FN, NEA-1, TSN, WC)
 Bob Brudzinski, Ohio State (AFCA, AP-1, FWAA, UPI-2, CFN, NEA-2, TSN [LB])
 Mike Butler, Kansas (NEA-1 [DT], TSN [DT], FN)
 Duncan McColl, Stanford (AP-2, UPI-1, CFN, WC)
 Robin Cole, New Mexico (AP-3, UPI-2, NEA-2 [LB])
 Nate Toran, Rutgers (AP-2)
 Phil Dokes, Oklahoma State (NEA-2)
 Cary Godette, East Carolina (AP-3)

Defensive tackles 

 Joe Campbell, Maryland (AFCA, AP-2, FWAA, UPI-2, CFN, NEA-1, TSN [DE])
 Wilson Whitley, Houston (AFCA, AP-1, FWAA, FN, NEA-2, WC)
 Gary Jeter, Southern California (AP-2, FWAA, UPI-1, NEA-1 [DE])
 Mike Fultz, Nebraska (UPI-1, FN, NEA-2, TSN, WC)
 Eddie Edwards, Miami (Fla.) (AP-1)
 Phil Dokes, Oklahoma State (AP-3, CFN)
 Nick Buonamici, Ohio State (UPI-2)
 Wilson Faumuina, San Jose State (AP-3)

Middle guards 

 Al Romano, Pittsburgh (AFCA, AP-1, UPI-1, FN, NEA-1, WC)
 Gary Don Johnson, Baylor (AP-2)
 Mike Stensrud, Iowa State (NEA-2)
 Harvey Hull, Mississippi State (UPI-2)
 Jeff Sapp, Navy (AP-3)

Linebackers 

 Robert Jackson, Texas A&M  (AFCA, AP-1, FWAA, UPI-1, FN, NEA-1, TSN, WC)
 Jerry Robinson, UCLA  (AP-1, FWAA, NEA-1)
 Thomas Howard, Texas Tech (AFCA, AP-2, CFN, WC)
 Calvin O'Neal, Michigan (AP-2, UPI-1, CFN, TSN, WC)
 Brian Ruff, The Citadel (AP-1, UPI-2)
 Kurt Allerman, Penn State (AP-3, UPI-1)
 Gary Spani, Kansas State (FN)
 Paul Nunu, Wyoming (FN)
 Clete Pillen, Nebraska (AP-2, UPI-2)
 Scott Studwell, Illinois (AP-3, NEA-2)
 David Lewis, USC (UPI-2)
 Ray Costict, Mississippi State (AP-3)

Defensive backs 

 Bill Armstrong, Wake Forest (AFCA, AP-1, FWAA, UPI-1, FN, TSN, WC)
 Dave Butterfield, Nebraska (AFCA, AP-3, UPI-1, CFN, FN, NEA-1, WC)
 Gary Green, Baylor (AFCA, AP-1, UPI-2, CFN, NEA-1, TSN)
 Dennis Thurman, USC (AP-1, FWAA, UPI-2, WC)
 Oscar Edwards, UCLA (AFCA, UPI-1)
 Luther Bradley, Notre Dame (FN, NEA-2, WC)
 Mike Davis, Colorado (NEA-1)
 Stan Black, Mississippi State (AP-2, NEA-1)
 Lester Hayes, Texas A&M (TSN)
 Eric Harris, Memphis State (CFN)
 Raymond Clayborn, Texas (NEA-2, TSN)
 Zac Henderson, Oklahoma (AP-2)
 Jimmy Stewart, Tulsa (AP-2)
 Jim Bolding, East Carolina (NEA-2)
 Ray Griffin, Ohio State (UPI-2, NEA-2)
 Bob Jury, Pittsburgh (AP-3)
 Jeff Nixon, Richmond (AP-3)

Special teams

Kickers 

 Tony Franklin, Texas A&M (FWAA, UPI-1, CFN, NEA-2)
 Steve Little, Arkansas (AFCA)
 Neil O'Donoghue, Auburn (TSN)
 Carson Long, Pittsburgh (UPI-2)

Punters 

 Tom Skladany, Ohio State (CFN, NEA-1 [placekicker], TSN)
 Russell Erxleben, Texas (FWAA, NEA-2)
 Glen Walker, Southern California (NEA-1)

Returner 

 Jim Smith, Michigan (FWAA)

Key 

 Bold – Consensus All-American
 -1 – First-team selection
 -2 – Second-team selection
 -3 – Third-team selection

Official selectors

 AFCA – American Football Coaches Association
 AP – Associated Press
 FWAA – Football Writers Association of America
 UPI – United Press International

Other selectors
 CFN – College Football News (Tom Harmon)
 FN – Football News
 NEA – Newspaper Enterprise Association
 TSN – The Sporting News
 WC – Walter Camp Football Foundation

See also
 1976 All-Big Ten Conference football team
 1976 All-Pacific-8 Conference football team
 1976 All-SEC football team

References 

All-America Team
College Football All-America Teams